Joaquín del Real (20 May 1941 – 4 April 2018) was a Spanish rower. He competed in the men's coxed pair event at the 1960 Summer Olympics.

References

1941 births
2018 deaths
Spanish male rowers
Olympic rowers of Spain
Rowers at the 1960 Summer Olympics
Sportspeople from Seville